The Proud Ones is a 1956 American CinemaScope Western film directed by Robert D. Webb and starring Robert Ryan and Virginia Mayo. The film was based on the 1952 novel by Verne Athanas who after suffering an early heart attack, he gave up logging and started writing under the pseudonym Bill Colson.

Plot
Cass Silver, marshal  of a small Kansas town, is expecting trouble with the arrival of the first Texas trail herds on the newly completed railroad. The town’s new saloon owner, Honest John Barrett is anticipating an increase in business; he and Silver have negative history between them and Barrett wants rid of the marshal. To make matters worse, the marshal's deputy, Thad Anderson, formerly one of the trail cowboys, is the son of a gunfighter Cass shot years before. Thad wants to avenge this death; he has always believed his father was unarmed when Silver shot him. Eventually, Thad realizes the truth and helps the marshal restore law and order to the town.

Cast
 Robert Ryan as Marshal Cass Silver
 Virginia Mayo as Sally
 Jeffrey Hunter as Thad Anderson
 Robert Middleton as Honest John Barrett
 Walter Brennan as Jake
 Arthur O'Connell as Jim Dexter
 Fay Roope as Markham
 Ken Clark as Pike
 Rodolfo Acosta as Chico
 George Mathews as Dillon
 Edward Platt as Dr. Barlow
 Whit Bissell as Mr. Sam Bolton
 Edward Mundy as Saloon Barker
 I. Stanford Jolley as Crooked Card Player
 William Fawcett as Driver
 Richard Deacon as Barber
 Jackie Coogan as Man on the Make
 Harry Carter as Houseman
 Don Brodie as Hotel Clerk

Production
Film rights were purchased by 20th Century Fox in November 1952 who assigned Frank Rosenberg to produce. Victor Mature, Robert Wagner and Debra Paget were originally announced as stars.

The film was not made for a number of years however. In December 1955 Fox said the leads would be played by Robert Ryan, and Virginia Mayo and it would be produced by Robert Jacks with filming to start December 28. Joseph Petracca did a rewrite of the script. Guy Madison was meant to co-star. He dropped out and was replaced by Robert Stack. In early January Stack was replaced by Jeffrey Hunter.

Music
The "Theme from the Proud Ones" written by Lionel Newman, recorded by Nelson Riddle, reached number 39 on the US charts on August 4, 1956.

Reception 
The Japanese filmmaker Akira Kurosawa cited The Proud Ones as one of his 100 favorite films.

See also
 List of American films of 1956

References

External links
 
 
 
 
 
 
 

1956 films
1956 Western (genre) films
20th Century Fox films
American Western (genre) films
Films directed by Robert D. Webb
Films scored by Lionel Newman
Films set in Kansas
CinemaScope films
Films based on Western (genre) novels
1950s English-language films
1950s American films